Spies is an American comedy-drama series that aired on CBS for one season, from March 3 until April 14, 1987. The original, unaired pilot starred Tony Curtis in the lead role.

Cast
 George Hamilton as Agent Ian Stone
 Gary Kroeger as Agent Ben Smythe
 Barry Corbin as Thomas "C of B" Brady

Episodes

References

External links
 

1980s American drama television series
1987 American television series debuts
1987 American television series endings
CBS original programming
English-language television shows
Espionage television series
Television shows set in Los Angeles
Television series by Lorimar-Telepictures